Richie Todd Lewis (January 25, 1966 – December 8, 2021) was an American professional baseball player.

Early life 
Lewis was born in 1966 to Kathy and Lawrence (Larry) Lewis. His younger sister, Emily, was born in 1971. Both of his parents were teachers throughout Lewis's childhood and were very involved in his life from a young age. His father coached all of his baseball, football, and basketball teams growing up as well.

Career
Lewis attended Southside High School in Muncie, where his father was the coach for many years. He then went on to attend Florida State University. In 1986, he played collegiate summer baseball with the Falmouth Commodores of the Cape Cod Baseball League and was named a league all-star.

Originally drafted by the Montreal Expos 44th overall in the 1987 draft, Lewis spent a few years in the minors before making his big-league debut. He played only two games professionally in 1987, both in AAA ball. He would prove to be a very valuable minor league player over the next few seasons, both as a starter and reliever.

He made his MLB debut on July 31, 1992 at the age of 26. He gave up five hits and walked six, but he still managed to earn the win.

Lewis was selected in the 51st round of the 1992 Expansion draft by the Florida Marlins.

He would mostly be used as a reliever for the rest of his career, with his best season being . In 57 games, he posted a 3.26 ERA and 65 strikeouts. Overall, he went 14 and 15 in his career, with 191 walks, 244 strikeouts and a 4.88 ERA in 217 games. Although his major league career ended on June 4, 1998, he bounced around in the minors until 2003.  He was the pitching coach for the Columbus Catfish in 2006.

Personal life 
In 1992, during Lewis's time with the Rochester Red Wings, he met his wife, Andrea, in Rochester, New York and they were married that same year. In March of 1993, they had their first daughter, McKenzie. They had two more children after that, Mariah (1995) and Jacob (1998), and moved to Melbourne, Florida.

Lewis died on December 8, 2021, at the age of 55.

References

External links

1966 births
2021 deaths
All-American college baseball players
American expatriate baseball players in Canada
Baltimore Orioles players
Baseball players from Indiana
Buffalo Bisons (minor league) players
Charlotte Knights players
Cincinnati Reds players
Detroit Tigers players
Edmonton Trappers players
Falmouth Commodores players
Florida Marlins players
Florida State Seminoles baseball players
Indianapolis Indians players
Jacksonville Expos players
Long Island Ducks players
Major League Baseball pitchers
Newark Bears players
Norfolk Tides players
Oakland Athletics players
Rochester Red Wings players
Sportspeople from Muncie, Indiana
Toledo Mud Hens players
West Palm Beach Expos players
Anchorage Glacier Pilots players